The Munster Senior League is an association football league organised by the Munster Football Association. It organises seven divisions as well as various cup competitions. Its Senior Division is a third level division in the Republic of Ireland football league system. Munster Senior League teams also compete in the Munster Senior Cup, the FAI Cup, the FAI Intermediate Cup and the FAI Junior Cup. In recent seasons the winners of the Senior Division have qualified to play in the League of Ireland Cup. Despite using the Munster name in its title, the vast majority of its member clubs are based in County Cork. However, in the past it has included clubs from County Limerick, County Waterford, County Kerry and County Tipperary.

History

Early years
The original Munster Football Association was founded in 1901 and it is believed that a Munster League was founded within a few years. The 1909–10 season saw six teams representing the Highland Light Infantry, the Royal Welch Fusiliers, the Durham Light Infantry, the Sherwood Foresters, the King's Regiment and Haulbowline all played in the Munster League First Division. A Munster Intermediate League featured the reserve teams of all these British Army regiments plus teams representing the Royal Engineers, the Royal Field Artillery and the Royal Army Service Corps. In the Munster Cup the Highland Light Infantry lost 1–0 to the Royal Welsh Fusiliers in the final played at Turner's Cross. Cahir Park F.C. was founded in 1910 and by 1912–13 they were the Munster Senior League second division champions. However these leagues were effectively disbanded during the First World War and Irish War of Independence era.

Reformed
In 1921 Harry Buckle, a former Ireland international, settled in Cork and began working for the Ford Motor Company. Finding little or no association football activity in the city, Buckle initially founded Fordsons F.C. and then helped found the County Cork–based South Munster League for the team to play in. In addition to playing and coaching with the new club, Buckle also served as president of the Tipperary/Limerick based – North Munster League and helped reform the Munster Football Association. By 1922–23 the South Munster League and North Munster Leagues had effectively merged to become the Munster Senior League. Barrackton United of the South Munster League became the first post–First World War  Munster Senior League champions after defeating Cahir Park F.C. of the North Munster League in a play-off.

Teams

Intermediate Leagues

Representative team
A Munster Senior League representative team competes in the FAI Intermediate Interprovincial Tournament against teams representing the Ulster Senior League, the Leinster Senior League and Connacht.

2022-23 season

Senior Premier Division

References

External links
Official website
Munster FA